Jean Ueberschlag (born 29 May 1935 in Folgensbourg, Haut-Rhin) was a member of the National Assembly of France between 1986 and 2012. He represented the Haut-Rhin department,  and was a member of the Union for a Popular Movement. He was the mayor of Saint-Louis (Haut-Rhin) from 1989 to September 2011.

References

1935 births
Living people
People from Haut-Rhin
Rally for the Republic politicians
Union for a Popular Movement politicians
United Republic politicians
Mayors of places in Grand Est
Deputies of the 12th National Assembly of the French Fifth Republic
Deputies of the 13th National Assembly of the French Fifth Republic